Sebastiano Lo Monaco (on September 18, 1958) is an Italian actor of theatre, cinema and television.

Career
Sebastiano Lo Monaco was born in Floridia, Sicily. He attended the Silvio d'Amico National Academy of Dramatic Arts and, in 1989, he became "capocomico" and artistic director. With his theater company, he produces several theatrical plays, like Henry IV, Right You Are (if you think so), Il berretto a sonagli, Tonight We Improvise, Six Characters in Search of an Author, Non si sa come by Luigi Pirandello, Cyrano de Bergerac by Edmond Rostand, A View from the Bridge by Arthur Miller, Othello by William Shakespeare, Non è vero... ma ci credo by Peppino De Filippo, Iphigenia in Aulis by Euripides and Per non morire di mafia by Pietro Grasso, where he is always the protagonist. From May 2000 to March 2004, he was the artistic director of the Vittorio Emanuele II Theatre in Messina.

He also appears in a lot of films and television series, like Festa di laurea, I Vicerè, Dove siete? Io sono qui, Body Guards, Gli angeli di Borsellino, Joe Petrosino (as Vito Cascio Ferro), A Violent Life, La piovra 8 and 9 (as Lawyer Torrisi), and L'onore e il rispetto (as Lawyer Vasile).

Filmography

Film
 Petomaniac (1983)
 Graduation Party (1985)
 Spogliando Valeria (1989)
 Panama Sugar (1990)
 Body Puzzle (1992)
 Where Are You? I'm Here (1993)
 Prima del tramonto (1999)
 Maestrale (2000)
 Body Guards (2000)
 Gli angeli di Borsellino (2003)
 Se sarà luce sarà bellissimo - Moro: Un'altra storia (2004)
 I Vicerè (2007)
 Baarìa (2009)
 Io, Don Giovanni (2009)
 La vita è una cosa meravigliosa (2010)
 Napoletans (2011)
 Lilith's Hell (2015)

Television
 Vita di Antonio Gramsci (1981)
 A Violent Life (1990)
 La piovra,  (1997)
 Un prete tra noi (1997)
 La piovra,  (1998)
 Sarò il tuo giudice (2001)
 Storia di guerra e d'amicizia (2002)
 Don Matteo (2004)
 Joe Petrosino (2006)
 L'onore e il rispetto (2009)
 Saint Philip Neri: I Prefer Heaven (2010)
 Il delitto di Via Poma (2011)

See also 
Alumni of the Accademia Nazionale di Arte Drammatica Silvio D'Amico

References

External links

1958 births
Living people
Italian male television actors
Italian male film actors
Actors from Sicily